Dermorhytis is a genus of leaf beetles in the subfamily Eumolpinae. It is found in south Asia, southeast Asia and southwest China.

Species
The following species are placed in the genus:

 Dermorhytis andrewesi Jacoby, 1895
 Dermorhytis atkinsoni Jacoby, 1908
 Dermorhytis biangulata Jacoby, 1908
 Dermorhytis ceylonensis Jacoby, 1887
 Dermorhytis costata Jacoby, 1908
 Dermorhytis cuprea Jacoby, 1887
 Dermorhytis foveata Tan, 1982
 Dermorhytis fulvipes Jacoby, 1903
 Dermorhytis igneofasciata Baly, 1861
 Dermorhytis imitans Jacoby, 1908
 Dermorhytis kandyensis Jacoby, 1908
 Dermorhytis lewisi Jacoby, 1887
 Dermorhytis martini Allard, 1895
 Dermorhytis ornatissima Baly, 1864
 Dermorhytis punctatissima (Jacoby, 1887)
 Dermorhytis rugosa Jacoby, 1908
 Dermorhytis speciosa Jacoby, 1895
 Dermorhytis variabilis Jacoby, 1887
 Dermorhytis violacea Jacoby, 1908
 Dermorhytis viridinitens Jacoby, 1908
 Dermorhytis viridis Jacoby, 1884
 Dermorhytis yunnanensis Tan & Wang, 1984

Synonyms:
 Dermorhytis fortunei Baly, 1861: moved to Abirus
 Dermorhytis hirsuta (Jacoby, 1900): synonym of Lophea melancholica Baly, 1865
 Dermorhytis longipes Jacoby, 1894: moved to Chrysonopa

References

Eumolpinae
Chrysomelidae genera
Taxa named by Joseph Sugar Baly
Beetles of Asia